The 2014 AFL season was the 23rd season in the Australian Football League contested by the Adelaide Crows.

Squad

Playing list changes

The following summarises all player changes between the conclusion of the 2013 season and the conclusion of the 2014 season.

In

Out

List management

Season summary

Pre-season matches
2014 NAB Challenge

Home and away season

Individual awards and records

Milestones
Round 3 - Matt Crouch (debut)
Round 5 - Scott Thompson (250 career games), Matthew Jaensch (50 career games)
Round 6 - Eddie Betts (300 career goals)
Round 9 - Charlie Cameron (debut)
Round 12 - Cam Ellis-Yolmen (debut)
Round 13 - Brent Reilly (200 career games)
Round 17 - Eddie Betts (200 career games)
Round 18 - Richard Douglas (150 career games), James Podsiadly (100 career games)
Round 19 - Sam Jacobs (100 career games)
Round 23 - Rory Sloane (100 career games)

All-Australian Team
Daniel Talia - Full-back
Brodie Smith - Half-back flank
Eddie Betts (nominated)
Sam Jacobs (nominated)

AFL Rising Star
The following Adelaide players were nominated for the 2014 NAB AFL Rising Star award:
Round 5 – Matt Crouch (nominated)

22 Under 22 team
Daniel Talia - Full-back
Brodie Smith - Half-back flank

References

Adelaide Football Club seasons
Adelaide